Nusli Wadia (born 15 February 1944) is an Indian billionaire businessman and the chairman of the Wadia Group, an Indian conglomerate involved in the FMCG, textiles and real estate industries among others. His net worth was estimated at US$4.1 billion by Forbes in August 2021.

Personal life 

Nusli was born into the prominent Parsi Wadia family in Bombay. He is the son of businessman Neville Wadia and Dina Wadia. 

His paternal grandfather Sir Ness Wadia was a well known textile industrialist and played an important role during the late 19th century in turning the city of Bombay into one of the world's largest cotton trading centers, while his paternal grandmother was an Englishwoman, Evelyne Clara Powell, from Yorkshire. 

His maternal grandfather Muhammad Ali Jinnah was the founder of Pakistan, while, his maternal grandmother, Rattanbai Petit was born into one of the elite Parsi families of India, the Petit. He once held a British citizenship for sometime by descent as his father had been born in the UK.  Wadia was educated at Cathedral and John Connon School. He was also educated at the Rugby School in England. He later went to the University of Florida and earned a PhD in Chemical Engineering.

He is married to Maureen Wadia, a former air hostess, who heads Gladrags magazine and is one of the organizers of Mrs. India beauty pageant. They have two sons: Ness Wadia and Jehangir Wadia.

In 2004, Wadia accompanied his mother Dina and sons Ness and Jeh, on a visit to Pakistan, during which he visited the mausoleum of his grandfather Muhammad Ali Jinnah, and grandaunt Fatima Jinnah in Karachi.

Career 
In 1962, Nusli entered Bombay Dyeing as a trainee in the spring mills. In 1970, Nusli was appointed managing joint director. In 1971, Nusli learned that his father was planning to sell the company to R. P. Goenka and move abroad. Nusli was only 26 at the time and had his own ambitions to run the company. With the help of his mother, sister, friends, and his mentor J.R.D Tata he began garnering 11 per cent of the company shares and went on to persuade the employees to pool their savings and buy shares to prevent the sale. Nusli then flew down to London where his father was making the deal, and convinced him not to sell the company or emigrate. In 1977 Nusli succeeded his father as the chairman of the company.

In 2016, Wadia announced that he will be filing a defamation case against Ratan Tata and his Tata group, after being removed as the independent director of Tata Motors. In January 2020, Wadia withdrew the defamation case, following Tata's statement that there was no intention to defame Wadia.

References

External links
 Bombay Dyeing website
 Wadia Group website

Living people
1944 births
Indian businesspeople in textiles
Indian chief executives
Indian billionaires
Parsi people from Mumbai
Businesspeople from Mumbai
Wadia family